Narayan Singh Pun (died February 21, 2008, in New Delhi, India) was a Nepalese politician. Prior to starting his political career, he had been a helicopter pilot and lieutenant colonel in the Royal Nepal Army.

He was elected to the Pratinidhi Sabha in the 1999 election on behalf of the Nepali Congress. He was later expelled from the party on the grounds of collaborating with the king. He later founded the Nepal Samata Party.

Pun founded Karnali Air in 2001.

Narayan Singh Pun died at a hospital in New Delhi, India, on February 21, 2008, from an infection that had emerged after a kidney transplant. He was 59 years old.

References

2008 deaths
Nepali Congress politicians from Gandaki Province
Nepal Samata Party politicians
Infectious disease deaths in India
Year of birth missing
Nepal MPs 1999–2002
Nepalese Army Air Service personnel
Airline founders